The 1945–46 Czechoslovak Extraliga season was the third season of the Czechoslovak Extraliga the top level of ice hockey in Czechoslovakia. 12 teams participated in the league, and LTC Prag won the championship. Due to World War II, it was the first time since 1937–38 the league had been played.

Regular season

Group A

Group B

Final
LTC Prag 3 CLTK Prag 1

1. Liga-Qualification

External links
History of Czechoslovak ice hockey

Czechoslovak Extraliga seasons
Czech
Extra